Cynthia Klitbo (born March 11, 1967) is a Mexican actress of telenovelas, theater and Mexican cinema. She is best known for her roles as Laura in Televisa's telenovela La Dueña (Mexico) (1995), as Tamara de Duval in Televisa's telenovela El privilegio de amar (1998) and as Raquela Villaseñor in the (2003) telenovela Velo de novia as well as Juana Godoy de González in Televisa's telenovela Teresa (2010 telenovela).

Biography 
Cynthia Klitbo was born on March 11, 1967, in Fresnillo, Zacatecas to a Danish father and a Mexican mother. She began her television career in 1987 playing a secondary character in the telenovela Como Duele Callar Amor en Silencio, Mi Segunda Madre, Yo Compro Esa Mujer, and Cadenas de Amargura soon followed.

After a brief hiatus in the mid-1990s, she returned to the small screen in La Dueña". Notable performances in Alguna vez Tendremos alas, El Privilegio de Amar, and La Casa en la Playa established Cynthia as one of the best known actresses of her generation.

Klitbo's work in telenovelas made her recognizable internationally. Although she has starred as a protagonist, she is best known for her performances as a villain. An example is Klitbo's portrayal of the envious and psychotic Laura in La Duena opposite Angelica Rivera. Her portrayal in El Privilegio de Amar as Tamara won her a prize in Premios TvyNovelas as best antagonist. In the said telenovela, Klitbo had to shave her head in a scene to portray her character's emotional defeat and insanity.

In 2005 Klitbo also worked as director of the telenovela Alborada produced by Carla Estrada. However, the two television personalities conflicted and Klitbo left the production days later. Later in the year she participated in the reality show Bailando por un sueño ("Dancing for a dream"), the Mexican version of Strictly Come Dancing, (the United States version is Dancing with the Stars'').

On Tuesday, August 1, 2006, she gave birth to an 8.5 pound baby girl via caesarian section. She named her Elisa Fernanda. On Saturday, September 29, 2012, Cynthia married the sculptor David Gerstein in a civil ceremony. The religious ceremony took place in February 2013. She currently lives in Mexico City.

Filmography

Films

Television

Awards and nominations

References

External links
 
 Cynthia Klitbo at the Telenovela database

1967 births
Living people
Mexican telenovela actresses
Mexican television actresses
Mexican film actresses
20th-century Mexican actresses
21st-century Mexican actresses
Mexican people of Danish descent
Actresses from Zacatecas